Michael Caren is an American record producer, songwriter, music publisher, A&R representative, and music executive. He is the current CEO (and founder) of Artist Partner Group and Creative Officer at Warner Music Group. He is also the founder of the Artist Publishing Group and the former President of Worldwide A&R at Warner Music Group. Prior to that, Caren was the Executive Vice President of A&R at Atlantic Records and the co-president of Elektra Records. In addition to his work as a music executive, Caren has also written or produced numerous songs for artists including Beyoncé, Bruno Mars, Kanye West, and others.

Early life
Caren grew up in Beverly Hills, California. When he was 12 years old, he began DJing at local parties in his neighborhood. He attended Beverly Hills High School and worked on a radio and music video show which was on the school channel. While still in high school, at age 15, Caren was offered an internship at Interscope Records by Fade Duvernay. He also founded a Los Angeles-based high school and college marketing company called Skool Rules Promotions.  He attended the Stern School of Business at New York University.

Career
While interning at Interscope Records, Caren worked on the marketing campaigns for artists like Tupac Shakur. He then went on to work for Loud Records/RCA as a National High School/College Rep. Coordinator and then Ruthless Records as the National Marketing Manager. At age 17, he was offered a marketing job at Big Beat Records, owned by Atlantic Records. Caren took the job and moved from Los Angeles to New York City. During his time at Big Beat, he was also producing records for The Pharcyde, Heltah Skeltah, Saukrates, and several other hip hop artists. After two years in the marketing department, Caren switched over to working in A&R. Among the first artists he brought to Big Beat was Twista.

Caren would eventually be promoted to Executive Vice President of A&R at Atlantic Records in 2007. Some of the acts he signed included Trina, Sunshine Anderson, and Platinum-selling artist, Trick Daddy. He also discovered and signed Nappy Roots while the group was still attending school at Western Kentucky University. Over the course of his tenure at Atlantic, Caren has been responsible for signing numerous other artists including, T.I., Plies, Trey Songz, Flo Rida, Wiz Khalifa and others. He also founded the Artist Publishing Group, a boutique music publishing company in association with Warner/Chappell Music.

In 2009, Caren was named Co-President of the revived Warner-owned Elektra Records alongside John Janick. In his capacity as co-head of the label, he helped sign and work with artists like CeeLo Green, Bruno Mars, and Ed Sheeran. In 2012, Caren was named the Warner Music Group's President of Worldwide A&R. In this post, he was responsible for artist development across numerous record labels including Atlantic Records, Elektra Records, Warner Bros. Records, and many international affiliates. WMG's constituent record labels continued seeing success with artists like Bruno Mars, Flo Rida, Ed Sheeran, and B.o.B. In 2013, Caren launched Artist Partners Group, a sister-company to the Artist Publishing Group, which provides a variety of services to artists and producers including marketing, business development, mentoring, access to recording studios, and legal support.

In 2016, Caren was named the Creative Officer of the Warner Music Group. Under this title, Caren acts as an advisor to WMG's global A&R department and also continues to work directly with WMG artists like David Guetta and Jason Derulo (among others). WMG also made a multi-millionaire dollar investment in Artist Partners Group which houses acts like Kevin Gates and Charlie Puth. Over the course of his career, Caren has signed or co-signed 19 Platinum- or Gold-selling artists. His Artist Publishing Group, which maintains a roster of around 30 songwriters (including Caren himself), was responsible for 30 Billboard Hot 100 entries in 2015.

In 2022, Caren joined beatBread's Artist Advocacy Council, which provides critical advice to the independent artist-focused music funding platform. Caren joins Dave Dederer (founding member of The Presidents of the United States of America), Diana Rodriguez (Criteria Entertainment), Gabe Saporta (founding member of Cobra Starship and The Artist Group), Kei Henderson (Third & Hayden), Ray Daniels (Raydar, LLC), and Nick Jarjour (Hipgnosis).

Selected discography

References

1977 births
Living people
Place of birth missing (living people)
American music industry executives
Record producers from California
Songwriters from California
American male songwriters